James Cameron Kettle (4 July 1925 – 16 September 2018) was an Australian rules footballer who played with Fitzroy in the Victorian Football League (VFL).

Notes

External links 

1925 births
Australian rules footballers from Melbourne
Fitzroy Football Club players
2018 deaths
People from Brunswick, Victoria